Osman Kebir, also known as Osman Mohamed Yousif Kibir, is the governor of the North Darfur province of Sudan. He was previously the governor of North Darfur. In September 2018, Kebir was appointed as the Second Vice President of Sudan.

He has publicly denied that the Janjaweed had any link to the government. In October 2004, he accused numerous international organizations and observers of the Darfur conflict of bias against the Sudanese government. Kofi Annan met him in provincial capital El Fasher in 2004, to call on protection of Darfur villagers.

References

Year of birth missing (living people)
Living people
Vice presidents of Sudan
Sudanese politicians
People from North Darfur
National Congress Party (Sudan) politicians